Fabrice Santoro and Nenad Zimonjić defeated Mahesh Bhupathi and Radek Štěpánek to win men's doubles at the 2007 Dubai Tennis Championships.

Seeds

  Mark Knowles /  Daniel Nestor (semifinals)
  Paul Hanley /  Kevin Ullyett (semifinals)
  Martin Damm /  Leander Paes (first round)
  Fabrice Santoro /  Nenad Zimonjić (champions)

Draw

Draw

External links
Association of Tennis Professionals (ATP) draw

Men's Doubles
2007 ATP Tour